Mesorhizobium tamadayense is a bacterium from the genus Mesorhizobium.

References

External links
Type strain of Mesorhizobium tamadayense at BacDive -  the Bacterial Diversity Metadatabase

Phyllobacteriaceae
Bacteria described in 2012